{{Speciesbox
|image=
|image_caption=
|status=DD
|status_system=IUCN3.1
|status_ref=<ref name=iucn>{{cite iucn |author1=G. Lyons |author2=L. Allcock |title='Opisthoteuthis robsoni |volume=2014 |page=e.T162967A958991 |doi=}}</ref>
|genus=Opisthoteuthis
|species=robsoni
|authority=O'Shea, 1999
}}Opisthoteuthis robsoni''' is a deep-sea octopus living off New Zealand on the Chatham Rise. Not much is known about the octopus' habitat or life cycle, as only four specimens have been found. It occupies the benthic zone, or the seafloor and the water directly above it. O. robsoni eats large amphipods.

The four specimens found so far are male. Like other males in the genus Opisthoteuthis, these specimens had some enlarged suckers on their arms. Unlike their sister taxa, however, O. robsoni'' males have enlarged suckers in the proximal field rather than the distal field (enlarged suckers closer to the body rather than toward the tip of the arm).

References

Cephalopods of Oceania
Endemic fauna of New Zealand
Endemic molluscs of New Zealand
Octopuses
Molluscs of New Zealand
Molluscs described in 1999
Molluscs of the Pacific Ocean